Etu is a form of boxing practiced in Flores, Indonesia.

Etu or ETU  may also refer to:

People 
 Etu Molden (born 1979), American football player
 Etu Uaisele (born 1984), Tongan rugby league footballer

Universities 
 Eckernforde Tanga University, in Tanzania
 Erzurum Technical University, in Turkey
 Saint Petersburg Electrotechnical University, in Russia
 TOBB University of Economics and Technology, in Ankara, Turkey

Other uses 
 Energy transfer upconversion
 Electrical Trades Union (disambiguation)
 Ethylene thiourea, a fungicide and pesticide
 European Taekwondo Union
 European Triathlon Union
 Jagham language

See also 
 E tū, a New Zealand trade union